Monika Ulrika Ann-Helén Laestadius (born 1971) is a Swedish Sami journalist and writer. In 2016, her novel Tio över ett (Ten Past One) won the Swedish August Prize as the best submission in the children and young adult category.

Biography
Born on 3 December 1971 in Jukkasjärvi in the far north of Sweden, Monika Ulrika Ann-Helén Laestadius is the daughter of the municipal employee Ivar Jan-Erik Laestadius (born 1951) and his wife Ellen Sara Kristina née Marainen (born 1948), a shop assistant. Now living in Solna near Stockholm, she has worked as a journalist since 1990.

In 2007, she published her first children's novel, Sms från Soppero (Sms from Soppero). It was followed by five others. Her Tio óver ett (Ten Past One) won the August Prize for Swedish children's literature in 2016. The jury commented: “It is about the collective grief of a changing community, about civil society and local politics, and about love and friendship. In energetic prose, Laestadius intertwines place, politics and psychology.” She was also awarded the Norrland Literature Prize (Norrlands litteraturpris) for the same work in 2017.

References

External links
Ann-Helén's page at Författarcentrum in Swedish
Ebook: Atlantbib.org

1971 births
Living people
Swedish journalists
Swedish women journalists
Swedish children's writers
Swedish women children's writers
Swedish Sámi people
Ann-Helen